Charles Klein Stobbs (July 2, 1929 – July 11, 2008) was an American professional baseball player. He played in Major League Baseball as a pitcher for the Boston Red Sox (1947–51), Chicago White Sox (1952), Washington Senators / Minnesota Twins (1953–58, 1959–61) and St. Louis Cardinals (1958). Stobbs is notable for being the pitcher who gave up an estimated 565-foot home run to Mickey Mantle that flew entirely out of Griffith Stadium in 1953. Mantle's 565-foot shot was regarded as the first tape-measure home run of the live-ball era.

Early life
Stobbs, a native of West Virginia, spent his early years in Springfield, Ohio and Vero Beach, Florida. His father, Bill Stobbs, played professional football in 1921. As a teenager his family moved to Norfolk, Virginia, where his father took a coaching job at Granby High School.

In high school, Stobbs excelled in three sports: football, basketball and baseball. He led the Granby High School football team to three consecutive state championships and was named all-state quarterback three times. Stobbs was also an all-American in baseball and a two-time all-state basketball player. In 1947, Stobbs was named by The Washington Post as one of the "greatest athletes to be developed in the Virginia high schools during recent years". In 1957, The Washington Post sports columnist Bob Addie wrote that Stobbs was "one of the greatest athletes ever to come out of Virginia." For his storied high-school career, Stobbs was later named to the Virginia Sports Hall of Fame in 2002.

Major League Baseball career 

Stobbs declined several college scholarships to play with the Boston Red Sox under the supervision of scout Specs Toporcer, who offered him a $50,000 signing bonus, one of the first players to qualify for baseball's bonus rule. Stobbs was only 18 years old when he pitched in his first big-league game, against the Chicago White Sox on September 15, 1947. He was the youngest player in Major League Baseball that year, appearing in four games. Stobbs played in six games in 1948 before being a full-time starter for the Red Sox in 1949. That season, Stobbs participated in 26 games, starting 19. He had an 11–6 win–loss record with a 4.03 earned run average while striking out 70 batters in 152 innings pitched.

He was turned down for service by the United States Army for the Korean War because of an asthmatic condition. Stobbs' production diminished in 1957, as he won eight games and led the league in losses with 20. He had a 16-game consecutive losing streak dating back to the previous September. In his last game of the 1957 season, Stobbs pitched 10 innings against the Baltimore Orioles before losing the game 7-3. That season he lost 20 games and joined the St. Louis Cardinals the next year after being purchased by the team.

Post-career 

After leaving professional baseball, Stobbs spent a brief time as an insurance salesman and a coach at George Washington University.

In 1971, Stobbs moved to Florida and worked at a baseball academy operated by the Kansas City Royals. He worked for the Cleveland Indians as a pitching coach in the minor leagues in the early 1980s.

Stobbs died after a seven-year battle with throat cancer on July 11, 2008.

References

External links

Chuck Stobbs - Baseballbiography.com

1929 births
2008 deaths
Baseball players from Norfolk, Virginia
Baseball players from West Virginia
Boston Red Sox players
Chicago White Sox players
Deaths from cancer in Florida
Deaths from throat cancer
Lynn Red Sox players
Major League Baseball pitchers
Minnesota Twins players
St. Louis Cardinals players
Sportspeople from Sarasota, Florida
Sportspeople from Wheeling, West Virginia
Washington Senators (1901–1960) players